The Chief of the General Staff of the Mongolian Armed Forces is the highest-ranking professional military leader in the Mongolian Armed Forces. The Chief of the General Staff carries out his duties under the governance of the Commander-in-Chief and serves as the principal advisor to him/her on military affairs. He/She is responsible for the implementation of operational orders and directives to maintain the combat readiness of the armed forces in peacetime. In wartime, the chief directs the military in accordance with the commander-in-chief.

From 1921-1992, the post was referred to as the Chief of the General Staff of the People's Army.

List of Chiefs

Mongolian People's Republic (1921–1992)
{| class="wikitable" style="text-align:center"
! rowspan=2| 
! rowspan=2| Portrait
! rowspan=2| Name
! colspan=3| Term of office
! rowspan=2| 
|-
! Took office
! Left office
! Time in office
|-

|-
| 5
| 
| D. I. Kochich
| 25 August 1923
| 1924
|  years
| 
|-

Mongolia (1990 – present)

References 

 
 

Military of Mongolia
Mongolia